Karl Edmund Lindmark (6 July 1894 – 11 February 1968) was a Swedish gymnast and diver who participated in the 1920, 1924 and 1928 Summer Olympics. In 1920 he was part of the Swedish team that won the gold medal in the Swedish system event. In 1924 and 1928 he competed in 3 m springboard diving and finished fourth in 1924. In this event he won national titles in 1926 and 1928 and a European silver medal at the 1927 European Championships.

His daughter Else-Marie Ljungdahl became an Olympic sprint canoer.

References

1894 births
1968 deaths
Divers at the 1924 Summer Olympics
Divers at the 1928 Summer Olympics
Gymnasts at the 1920 Summer Olympics
Olympic divers of Sweden
Olympic gold medalists for Sweden
Olympic gymnasts of Sweden
Swedish male artistic gymnasts
Swedish male divers
Olympic medalists in gymnastics
Medalists at the 1920 Summer Olympics
Stockholms KK divers
Sportspeople from Umeå
20th-century Swedish people